The Church of the Assumption of Mary was an Orthodox church in Mariupol, Ukraine.

History 
It was an Orthodox church dedicated to the Assumption of Mary. The architect Victor Nilsen designed and built this church between 1880 and 1887. The building stood until it was demolished in 1934 during the Soviet era by the Bolshevik government as part of the Atheist Five-Year Plan.

In the church there was the icon of Mary Odigitria also known as Mother of God of Mariupol. It was considered a miraculous icon.

Gallery

See also 
 Church of the Assumption of Mary, Mariupol (roman catholic)

References

Buildings and structures in Mariupol